Wesley Liu Hsu (born 1971) is an American state court judge who serves as a judge of the Los Angeles County Superior Court from California. He is a nominee to serve as a United States district judge of the United States District Court for the Central District of California.

Early life and education 
 
While in high school, Hsu's parents were struck and severely injured by a drunk driver while crossing a street. His father suffered a broken rib and his mother went into a coma that lasted for two and a half months.  The driver was sentenced to eight months in jail. Hsu, who thought the light sentence was an injustice to his parents, decided to pursue a legal career. Hsu received a Bachelor of Arts from Yale University in 1993 and a Juris Doctor from Yale Law School in 1996.

Career 

From 1996 to 1997, he served as a law clerk for Judge Mariana Pfaelzer of the United States District Court for the Central District of California. From 1997 to 2000, he was an associate at Gibson, Dunn and Crutcher LLP in Los Angeles. From 2000 to 2017, he served as an assistant United States attorney in the U.S. Attorney's Office for the Central District of California, including from 2008 to 2015 as Chief of the Cyber and Intellectual Property Crimes section and from 2015 to 2017 as executive assistant U.S. attorney. On November 2, 2017, Hsu was appointed a judge of the Los Angeles County Superior Court by California Governor Jerry Brown.

Notable cases 

 In 2009, Hsu prosecuted Michael Barrett, who plead guilty for secretly filming ESPN reporter Erin Andrews while she was nude. Barrett was accused of altering peepholes in the doors of two hotel rooms. 

 In 2015, Hsu prosecuted Hunter Moore, who pleaded guilty to federal computer hacking and identity theft charges for hiring another man to hack into e-mail accounts to steal nude photos that were later posted on his website.  Moore created the site IsAnyoneUp.com, which allowed for widespread publication and dissemination of revenge porn.

Nomination to district court 

On December 21, 2022, President Joe Biden announced his intent to nominate Hsu to serve as a United States district judge of the United States District Court for the Central District of California. On January 23, 2023, his nomination was sent to the Senate. President Biden nominated him to the seat vacated by Judge Virginia A. Phillips, who assumed senior status on February 14, 2022. His nomination is pending before the Senate Judiciary Committee. On February 15, 2023, a hearing on his nomination was held before the Senate Judiciary Committee.

References 

1971 births
Living people
20th-century American lawyers
21st-century American judges
American jurists of Asian descent
Assistant United States Attorneys
California state court judges
Lawyers from St. Louis
People associated with Gibson Dunn
Superior court judges in the United States
Yale University alumni
Yale Law School alumni